State Highway 45 (SH-45) is a  state highway in Idaho. It runs from SH-78 to Interstate 84 Business (I-84 Bus.) in Nampa.

Route description

SH-45 begins at an intersection with SH-78 before crossing the Snake River and heading northeast. The highway continues north into the city of Nampa as 12th Avenue Road, passing by Mercy Medical Center and Northwest Nazarene University. Then, SH-45 turns northeast on 12th Avenue before forming a one-way couplet with 11th Avenue before ending at 2nd Street South. The highway is a major freight corridor.

History

In 2011, the Nampa Development Corporation requested a realignment of SH-45 to redirect freight traffic away from downtown Nampa. The city government began studying a realignment in 2021 that would use one of several existing roads that lead to I-84 from the south side of downtown Nampa.

Major intersections

Connector route

State Highway 45 Connector (SH-45 Conn.) is a short route connecting SH-78 and SH-45.

References

045
Transportation in Owyhee County, Idaho
Transportation in Canyon County, Idaho